Mahabad, also Romanized as Mihābād and Muhābād and formerly known as Savojbolagh, is a city in the Central District of Mahabad County, West Azerbaijan province, Iran, and serves as capital of the county. At the 2006 census, its population was 133,324 in 31,000 households. The following census in 2011 counted 147,268 people in 38,393 households. The latest census in 2016 showed a population of 168,393 people in 47,974 households.

The city lies south of Lake Urmia in a narrow valley 1,300 metres above sea level.

Name 
Mahabad first became the name of the city after World War I, during the reign of the Pahlavi shah (king) Reza Shah. Before that, it was known as Savojbolagh, a Persian corruption of the Turkic word soghuk bulak (meaning "cold spring"). The Kurdish version was Sablagh.

History 

Savojbolagh is first attested in the 16th century, during the Safavid era. Mukri Kurds participated in several wars between Safavid dynasty and Ottoman Empire, and gained more predominance. In 17th century AD, Savojbolagh became the seat of Mukri principality (known as Mukriyān in Sorani Kurdish and Mokriyān in Persian). Many believe Budaq Sultan Mukri, who built Savojbolagh's congregational mosque is the founder of the current town.

Republic of Mahabad 

Mahabad was the capital of the short-lived Republic of Mahabad, which was declared independent on January 1, 1946 under the leadership of Kurdish nationalist Qazi Muhammad.

The republic received strong support from the Soviet Union, which occupied Iran during the same era. It included the majority Kurdish-speaking towns of Bukan, Piranshahr, Sardasht and Oshnavieh.

After an agreement brokered by the United States, the Soviets agreed to leave Iran, and sovereignty was restored to the Shah in 1947. The Shah ordered an invasion of the Republic of Mahabad shortly afterwards, the leaders of the republic including Qazi Muhammad were arrested and executed. Qazi Muhammad was hanged on 31 March 1947. At the behest of Archibald Roosevelt Jr., who argued that Qazi had been forced to work with the Soviets out of expediency, U.S. ambassador to Iran George V. Allen urged the Shah not to execute Qazi or his brother, only to be reassured: "Are you afraid I'm going to have them shot? If so, you can rest your mind. I am not." Roosevelt later recounted that the order to have the Qazis killed was likely issued "as soon as our ambassador had closed the door behind him," adding with regard to the Shah: "I never was one of his admirers."

Islamic Republic of Iran 
On 7 May 2015, the people of the city rioted following the unexplained death on 4 May 2015 of Farinaz Khosravani, a hotel chambermaid. Khosravani fell to her death from a fourth-floor window of the Tara hotel, the hotel where she worked. Anger mounted following reports that Khosravani died attempting to escape an official who was threatening to rape her. The rioters reportedly set fire to the hotel where Khosravani worked.

Language and religion
Most of Mahabad is populated by Kurds who follow the Sunni branch of Islam. Besides Kurdish, many speak Persian and Azeri Turkic as well. Neo-Aramaic-speaking Jews originally used to inhabit the city as well.

References

Sources

External links 

 Hemin Mukriani (iranica)
 Short Biography and works of Zabihi
 Article of the Monde Diplo on Mahabad (in French)

Mahabad County

 

Populated places in West Azerbaijan Province

Populated places in Mahabad County

Cities in West Azerbaijan Province

Iranian Kurdistan

Kurdish settlements in West Azerbaijan Province